Ecgberht of Northumbria may refer to:

Ecgberht I of Northumbria (deposed 872; died 873)
Ecgberht II of Northumbria (reigned 876–878×883)